Russia is one of the world's largest producers of nuclear energy. 
In 2020 total electricity generated in nuclear power plants in Russia was 215.746 TWh, 20.28% of all power generation. 
The installed gross capacity of Russian nuclear reactors is 29.4 GW in December 2020.

Recent history
In accord with legislation passed in 2001, all Russian civil reactors are operated by Energoatom. More recently in 2007 Russian Parliament adopted the law "On the peculiarities of the management and disposition of the property and shares of organizations using nuclear energy and on relevant changes to some legislative acts of the Russian Federation", which created Atomenergoprom - a holding company for all Russian civil nuclear industry, including Energoatom, nuclear fuel producer and supplier TVEL, uranium trader Tekhsnabexport (Tenex) and nuclear facilities constructor Atomstroyexport.

The overnight cost of construction in the seventies was a low 800 $/kW in 2016 dollars. In 2019 a S&P Global Ratings report stated Russia's nuclear construction costs were well below European levels because of vertical integration, good learning-curve effects from serial production, and the large currency devaluation of 2014.

The Russian nuclear industry employs around 200,000 people. Russia is recognized for its nuclear disaster expertise and for the safety of its technology. Statements made in review of Russian reactor safety [8] that "Requirements on placing the nuclear installation should not contain additional restrictions in comparison with other industrial facilities," suggest that nuclear plants could be placed within cities and are not considered to pose exceptional dangers. https://www.jstor.org/stable/1396196
Russia is also pursuing an ambitious plan to increase sales of Russian-built reactors overseas, and had 39 reactors under construction or planned overseas as of 2018.

The VVER-1200 pressurised water reactor is the system currently offered for construction, being an evolution of the VVER-1000 with increased power output to about 1200 MWe (gross) and providing additional passive safety features. In August 2016 the first VVER-1200, Novovoronezh II-1, was connected to the grid.

Through its membership in the multi-nation ITER project, Russia participates in the design of nuclear fusion reactors.

In 2013 the Russian state allocated 80.6 billion rubles ($2.4 billion) toward the growth of its nuclear industry, especially export projects where Russian companies build, own and operate the power station, such as the Akkuyu Nuclear Power Plant.

In 2016 initial plans were announced to build 11 new nuclear power reactors by 2030, including the first VVER-600, a smaller two cooling circuit version of the VVER-1200, designed for smaller regions and markets. Outline plans for near-surface disposal facilities for low and intermediate-level waste, and deep burial disposal facilities for high-level waste were also approved in the Krasnoyarsk Krai region.

In October 2017 Rosatom was reported to be considering postponing commissioning new nuclear plants in Russia due to excess generation capacity and that new nuclear electricity prices are higher than for existing plant.  The Russian government is considering reducing support for new nuclear under its support contracts, called Dogovor Postavki Moshnosti (DPM), which guarantee developers a return on investment through increased payments from consumers for 20 years. In 2019 a S&P Global Ratings report stated that "We expect domestic nuclear capacity to increase only moderately because electricity demand in Russia is stagnating, given only modest GDP growth, a significant potential for energy savings, and the government's intention to avoid raising electricity prices through additional increases in capacity payments".

Russia's first-floating nuclear power plant, Akademik Lomonosov, is equipped to provide power to a remote Russian town on the Bering Strait. The nuclear unit features small modular reactors (SMRs) technology.

Nuclear power reactors

Reactors in operation

Eleven of Russia's reactors are of the RBMK 1000 type, similar to the one at Chernobyl Nuclear Power Plant. Some of these RBMK reactors were originally to be shut down but have instead been given life extensions and uprated in output by about 5%. Critics say that these reactors are of an "inherently unsafe design", which cannot be improved through upgrades and modernization, and some reactor parts are impossible to replace. Russian environmental groups say that the lifetime extensions "violate Russian law, because the projects have not undergone environmental assessments".

International projects

In addition Atomstroyexport challenging NPP projects list contains:
 Temelin NPP Power Units 3/4 (Czech Republic)
 Jordan NPP (single-unit NPP with an option for the second power unit)
 Metsamor NPP Power Units 3/4 (Armenia)
 NPP with the Reactor Plant VBER-300 (Kazakhstan)
 Sanming NPP (China)

In August 2022, the Hungarian Nuclear Energy Authority authorized Rosatom to expand the nuclear power plant at Paks with two new VVER reactors with capacity of 1.2 gigawatts each.

Nuclear engineering companies
 Atomenergomash: power engineering company; produces steam generators for NPPs
 Atommash: by far Russia's largest nuclear engineering company designed to build up to 8 reactors per year.
 Atomstroyexport: nuclear power equipment and service export monopoly
 OKBM Afrikantov: nuclear reactor design and engineering company. The world's leading company in production of fast breeder reactors. 
 OKB Gidropress: nuclear reactor design and engineering company

Safety
Russia, responding to the 2011 Japanese nuclear accidents, will perform a 'stress test' on all its reactors "to judge their ability to withstand earthquakes more powerful than the original design anticipated".

See also 

 Energy policy of Russia
 Rosatom
 Russian floating nuclear power station
 Nuclear energy policy
 Juragua Nuclear Power Plant, (Cuba)

References

External links 

 
 World Nuclear Association: Nuclear Power in Russia
 World-nuclear.org